is a 1965 Japanese jidaigeki film co-written, edited, and directed by Akira Kurosawa, in his last collaboration with actor Toshiro Mifune. Based on Shūgorō Yamamoto's 1959 short story collection, Akahige Shinryōtan, the film takes place in Koishikawa, a district of Edo, towards the end of the Tokugawa period, and is about the relationship between a town doctor and his new trainee. Fyodor Dostoevsky's novel Humiliated and Insulted provided the source for a subplot about a young girl, Otoyo (Terumi Niki), who is rescued from a brothel.

The film looks at the problem of social injustice and explores two of Kurosawa's favorite topics: humanism and existentialism. A few critics have noted the film to be reminiscent in some ways of Ikiru. It is Kurosawa's last black-and-white film. The film was a major box office success in Japan but is known for having caused a rift between Mifune and Kurosawa, with this being the final collaboration between them after working on 16 films together. The film was screened in competition at the 26th Venice International Film Festival. Toshiro Mifune won a Volpi Cup for Best Actor for his performance in the film. It was also nominated for a Golden Globe for Best Foreign Language Film.

Plot
The young and arrogant doctor Noboru Yasumoto, trained in a Dutch medical school in Nagasaki, aspires to the status of personal physician of the Shogunate, a position currently held by a close relative, and expects to progress through the privileged and insulated army structure of medical education. However, for Yasumoto's post-graduate medical training, he is assigned to a rural clinic under the guidance of Dr. Kyojō Niide, known as Akahige ("Red Beard"). Beneath a gruff exterior, Dr. Niide is a compassionate and wise clinic director.

Yasumoto is initially livid at his posting, believing that he has little to gain from working under Dr. Niide. He assumes that Niide is only interested in seeing Yasumoto's medical notes from Nagasaki, and he rebels against the clinic director. He refuses to see patients or to wear his uniform, disdains the food and spartan environment, and enters a forbidden garden where he meets "The Mantis," a mysterious patient that only Dr. Niide can treat. Meanwhile, we learn that
Yasumoto's former fiancée, Chigusa, was unfaithful to him, ending their engagement, and generating a disdain in him for romantic relationships.

As Yasumoto struggles to come to terms with his situation, the film tells the story of a few of the clinic's patients. One of them is Rokusuke, a dying man whom Dr. Niide discerns is troubled by a secret misery that is only revealed when his desperately unhappy daughter shows up. Another is Sahachi, a well-loved man of the town known for his generosity to his neighbours, who has a tragic connection to his wife's corpse which is discovered after a landslide. After committing bigamy, she had him unknowingly kill her by asking that he "Hold me closer" when they were hugging while she surreptitiously held a knife to herself. Dr. Niide brings Yasumoto along to rescue a sick twelve-year-old girl, Otoyo, from a brothel (brutally fighting off a local gang of thugs to do so) and then assigns the girl to Yasumoto as his first patient. Through these experiences, Yasumoto begins to humble himself and open his eyes to the world around him.

When Yasumoto himself falls ill, Dr. Niide asks Otoyo to nurse him back to health, knowing that caring for Yasumoto will also be part of her own continued healing. Chigusa's younger sister, Masae, visits the clinic to check in on Yasumoto, telling him that his mother wants him to visit. Through his mother, Yasumoto learns that Chigusa now has a child with her new lover. Masae later makes a kimono for Otoyo, showing compassion that suggests she might be a good match for Yasumoto. Yasumoto's mother likes Masae and suggests marriage.

Yasumoto begins to understand the magnitude of cruelty and suffering around him, as well as his power to ease that suffering, and learns to regret his vanity and selfishness.

Later, when a local boy, Chôbu, is caught stealing food from the clinic, Otoyo shows him compassion and befriends him, passing on the compassion she received from Niide and Yasumoto. When the brothel's madam comes to the clinic to claim Otoyo and take her back to the brothel, the doctors and clinic staff refuse to let Otoyo go, and chase the madam away. When Chôbu and his destitute family try to escape their misery by taking poison together, the clinic doctors work to save them.

Yasumoto is offered the position of personal physician to the Shogunate he had so coveted. He agrees to marry Masae, but at the wedding announces that he will not accept the new position, but will stay at the clinic, turning down a comfortable and prestigious place in society to continue serving the poor alongside Dr. Niide.

Cast
 Toshiro Mifune as Dr. Kyojō Niide also known as "Red Beard", a rough-tempered yet charitable town doctor and martial artist.
 Yūzō Kayama as Dr. Noboru Yasumoto
 Tsutomu Yamazaki as Sahachi
 Reiko Dan as Osugi, a servant.
 Miyuki Kuwano as Onaka
 Kyōko Kagawa as "The Mantis", a madwoman.
 Tatsuyoshi Ehara as Genzo Tsugawa
 Terumi Niki as Otoyo
 Akemi Negishi as Okuni
 Yoshitaka Zushi as Chobu
 Yoshio Tsuchiya as Dr. Handayu Mori
 Eijirō Tōno as Goheiji
 Takashi Shimura as Tokubei Izumiya
 Chishū Ryū as Noboru's father
 Kinuyo Tanaka as Noboru's mother
 Kōji Mitsui as Heikichi
 Haruko Sugimura as Kin, the madam of a local brothel.
Cast taken from The Criterion Collection.

Production

Writing
After finishing High and Low (1963), director Akira Kurosawa, accidentally picked up Shūgorō Yamamoto's 1959 novel Akahige Shinryōtan. Although he initially believed it would make a good script for fellow director Hiromichi Horikawa, Kurosawa became so interested in it as he wrote, that he knew he would have to direct it himself. Kurosawa completed writing the script for the film in early July 1963, which he co-wrote with screenwriters Masato Ide, Hideo Oguni, and Ryūzō Kikushima. Kurosawa noted that the script was quite different from the book, specifically mentioning how the young girl main character was not in Yamamoto's novel. With this character, Kurosawa tried to show what Fyodor Dostoevsky showed using the character Nellie in Humiliated and Insulted.

Filming

Principal photography began on December 21, 1963, and wrapped up two years later. Kurosawa got sick twice during filming, while actors Toshiro Mifune and Yūzō Kayama fell ill once each. Mifune would never again work with Kurosawa because the director's increasingly long production schedules required Mifune to turn down too many other TV and movie offers. The set was intended to be as realistic and historically accurate as possible. Film historian Donald Richie wrote that the main set was an entire town with back alleys and side streets, some of which were never even filmed. The materials used were actually about as old as they were supposed to be, with the tiled roofs taken from buildings more than a century old and all of the lumber taken from the oldest available farmhouses. Costumes and props were "aged" for months before being used; the bedding (made in Tokugawa-period patterns) was actually slept in for up to half a year before shooting. The wood used for the main gate was over a hundred years old, and after filming, it was re-erected at the entrance to the theater that hosted Red Beards premiere.

Richie wrote that one could argue that Kurosawa "completely wasted his million yen set," as the main street is seen for only one minute (although its destruction was incorporated into the earthquake scene). Likewise, the scenes with the bridges and those in the elaborately constructed paddy are also rather brief. However, tourist bus companies did run tours through the set during the two years it took to make Red Beard.

According to Stephen Prince's audio commentary on the Criterion Collection's 2002 DVD, the film was shot at an aspect ratio of 2.35:1, and was Kurosawa's first film to use a magnetic 4-track stereo soundtrack.

Release
Toho was originally slated to release Red Beard during the New Year's holiday season, but it was delayed, forcing producer Tomoyuki Tanaka to produce Ghidorah, the Three-Headed Monster, instead. The film was eventually given a roadshow theatrical release in Japan by Toho on April 3, 1965, and was released throughout Japan on April 24, 1965. Toho International released the film to theaters in the United States with English subtitles in January 1966, and it was reissued by Frank Lee International in December 1968. In 1978, the film received a theatrical release in France, and sold 200,402 tickets during its theatrical run. The film was screened at the 72nd Venice International Film Festival in 2015.

In 1992, the film was released in the United States on LaserDisc by The Criterion Collection, and on VHS by Media Home Entertainment. The Criterion Collection released the film on DVD in the United States on July 16, 2002. Toho released the film on DVD in Japan on November 21, 2002 and reissued it on February 18, 2015. In 2014, Madman Entertainment distributed the film on DVD in Region 4.

Reception

Critical reception
On Rotten Tomatoes, the film has an approval rating of 73% based on 15 reviews, with an average rating of 7.50/10. The film has a score of 4.2/5 on Eiga.com, based on 41 reviews, with 56% of reviewers giving it a 5/5.

The film opened to highly positive reviews in Japan, with many calling it Kurosawa's magnum opus, and winning the Best Film award by the Japanese film magazine Kinema Junpo. However, the film received a mixed response from Western audiences; while it was a box-office success in Japan, it failed commercially abroad.

Roger Ebert gave the film four stars in a review dated December 26, 1969, writing "Akira Kurosawa's Red Beard is assembled with the complexity and depth of a good 19th–century novel, and it's a pleasure, in a time of stylishly fragmented films, to watch a director taking the time to fully develop his characters." Michael Sragow of The New Yorker wrote "This 1965 film, the last of Akira Kurosawa's collaboration with Toshiro Mifune, is often derided as a soap opera. But the story of a grizzled nineteenth-century doctor nicknamed Red Beard (Mifune) and his green physician (Yuzo Kayama) who learns human medical values from him — is actually a masterpiece."

In his 2015 Movie Guide, Leonard Maltin gave the film two and a half stars, calling it an "unoriginal drama is also way overlong ."

Accolades

References

Sources

External links
 
 
 
 Red Beard  at the Japanese Movie Database
 

1965 drama films
1965 films
Best Film Kinema Junpo Award winners
Films about physicians
Films based on multiple works
Films based on Russian novels
Films based on short fiction
Films based on works by Fyodor Dostoyevsky
Films directed by Akira Kurosawa
Films produced by Ryuzo Kikushima
Films produced by Tomoyuki Tanaka
Films scored by Masaru Sato
Films set in Edo
Films set in the 19th century
Films with screenplays by Akira Kurosawa
Films with screenplays by Hideo Oguni
Films with screenplays by Ryuzo Kikushima
Japanese black-and-white films
1960s Japanese-language films
Medical-themed films
Toho films
1960s Japanese films